Victor Huen (2 March 1874 – 15 December 1939) was a painter, lithographer and illustrator, specializing in military subjects and uniform illustrations. He was born in Colmar. He is most notable for his part in the series of uniform cards Les uniformes du Premier-Empire headed by commandant Louis-Eugène Bucquoy. Huen also collaborated with the illustrator Hansi on children's books.

Works
 Les uniformes du Premier-Empire, 1904–1914, collaboration
 L'histoire d'Alsace : racontée aux petits enfants d'Alsace et de France, 1915, with Hansi
 La merveilleuse histoire du bon Saint Florentin d'Alsace par l'oncle Hansi, 1925, with Hansi

Bibliography
 Henri Marcus, Victor Huen : peintre militaire alsacien 1874-1939 : sa vie son œuvre, Berger-Levrault, 1949 
 Francis Gueth, François Robichon, La grande armée par Victor Huen, Herscher, 2004
 Francis Gueth, « François Joseph Victor Huen », in Nouveau dictionnaire de biographie alsacienne, vol. 17, p. 1690

Military art
1874 births
1939 deaths
20th-century French painters
20th-century French male artists
French male painters
Painters from Alsace